Keiji Mizumoto (水本 圭治, Mizumoto Keiji, born 7 April 1988) is a Japanese canoeist. He competed in the men's K-4 500 metres event at the 2020 Summer Olympics.

References

External links
 

1988 births
Living people
Japanese male canoeists
Olympic canoeists of Japan
Canoeists at the 2020 Summer Olympics
Place of birth missing (living people)
Asian Games medalists in canoeing
Canoeists at the 2010 Asian Games
Canoeists at the 2014 Asian Games
Canoeists at the 2018 Asian Games
Asian Games gold medalists for Japan
Asian Games bronze medalists for Japan
Medalists at the 2010 Asian Games